The 1999–2000 Alabama–Huntsville Chargers ice hockey team represented the University of Alabama in Huntsville in the 1999–2000 NCAA Division I men's ice hockey season. The Chargers were coached by Doug Ross who was in his eighteenth season as head coach. The Chargers played their home games in the Von Braun Center.  The team joined the new College Hockey America conference after one season as a Division I independent.

Roster

|}

Season

Schedule

|-
!colspan=12 style=""| CHA Tournament

Standings

Statistics

Skaters

Goaltenders

References

Alabama Huntsville
Alabama–Huntsville Chargers men's ice hockey seasons
Ala
Alabama-Huntsville Chargers men's ice hockey
Alabama-Huntsville Chargers men's ice hockey